Garden Suburb is a small semi-rural community in the Lake Macquarie council in New South Wales. It is located 2 kilometres East of Cardiff.

History 
The Aboriginal people, in this area, the Awabakal, were the first people of this land. 

The first land grant was to James Peatie in August 1872. The street Peaties Road now carries his name.

Another land grant was given to John Cherry in March 1876, and the area was named Cherryville in his name.

The first subdivision occurred in 1918, encompassing Prospect Road, Park Road and Marshall Street.

A post office opened in 1956 and the local primary school opened in 1958. 

The Forest Hills Estate was constructed between 1999 and 2005 in the South. The streets were named with a theme of flora.

The town formerly had a post office and a convenience store, however these closed in 1987 and 2007, respectively.

The population has begun to decline in recent years.

Geography 
The town is surrounded by bushland, and can only be accessed from Myall Road.

Three creeks flow through the area:

 Winding Creek: Starts near Hillsborough and flows into Cockle Creek, then into Lake Macquarie.
 Tickhole Creek: Starts near Newcastle Bypass and flows into Winding Creek.
 Garden Suburb Creek: Starts from dam in Campbell Reserve and flows into Tickhole Creek.

Development Proposal 
Landcom Corporation proposed a 96-lot development in 2013, in the bushland near Myall Road. After initial objections, the project was shelved for several years.

In 2020, the project was fast-tracked after the coronavirus pandemic, and approved in December 2020. The development was scaled back to 66-lots in January.

References

External links
 History of Garden Suburb (Lake Macquarie City Library)

Suburbs of Lake Macquarie